Piaski (meaning "sands" in Polish) may refer to:

Greater Poland Voivodeship
Piaski, Gniezno County
Piaski, Gostyń County
Piaski, Kępno County
Piaski, Konin County
Piaski, Krotoszyn County
Piaski, Nowy Tomyśl County
Piaski, Rawicz County

Kuyavian-Pomeranian Voivodeship
Piaski, Grudziądz County 
Piaski, Świecie County
Piaski, Włocławek County

Łódź Voivodeship
Piaski, Gmina Bolesławiec
Piaski, Gmina Grabów
Piaski, Gmina Kleszczów
Piaski, Gmina Konopnica
Piaski, Gmina Lututów
Piaski, Gmina Świnice Warckie
Piaski, Gmina Szadek
Piaski, Gmina Wieluń 
Piaski, Łowicz County
Piaski, Piotrków County
Piaski, Radomsko County
Piaski, Gmina Zduńska Wola

Lublin Voivodeship
Piaski, Łuków County
Piaski, Świdnik County
Piaski, Włodawa County

Masovian Voivodeship
Piaski, Garwolin County
Piaski, Piaseczno County
Piaski, Płock County
Piaski, Gmina Jedlińsk
Piaski, Sierpc County
Piaski, Warsaw
Piaski, Wołomin County

Podlaskie Voivodeship
Piaski, Białystok, a district of the city of Białystok
Piaski, Białystok County
Piaski, Hajnówka County

Świętokrzyskie Voivodeship
Piaski, Jędrzejów County
Piaski, Kielce County
Piaski, Końskie County

Warmian-Masurian Voivodeship
Piaski, Ełk County
Piaski, Iława County
Piaski, Pisz County

West Pomeranian Voivodeship
Piaski, Łobez County
Piaski, Szczecinek County

Other regions
Piaski, Lesser Poland Voivodeship
Piaski, Lubusz Voivodeship
Piaski, Opole Voivodeship
Piaski, Pomeranian Voivodeship
Piaski, colloquial name of Nowa Karczma, Nowy Dwór Gdański County, now part of Krynica Morska in Pomeranian Voivodeship
Piaski, Częstochowa County in Silesian Voivodeship
Piaski, Subcarpathian Voivodeship

See also 
 Franki-Piaski
 Kolonia Piaski
 Piaski Bankowe
 Piaski Szlacheckie
 Stare Piaski